Jeremy Spencer may refer to:

 Jeremy Spencer (born 1948), British rock and roll musician, guitarist of Fleetwood Mac
Jeremy Spencer (album), 1970 self-titled album
Jeremy Spencer and the Children, 1972 album
 Jeremy Spencer (drummer) (born 1973), American heavy-metal drummer of Five Finger Death Punch
 Jeremy P. E. Spencer, British biochemist

See also
 Jeremy Spenser, British actor